The 1990 Cup of the Soviet Army Final was the 8th and last final of the Cup of the Soviet Army (as a secondary cup tournament in Bulgaria), and was contested between CSKA Sofia and Botev Plovdiv on 5 June 1990 at Ovcha Kupel Stadium in Sofia. CSKA won the final 2–1.

Match

Details

References

Football cup competitions in Bulgaria
1989–90 in Bulgarian football

Botev Plovdiv matches
PFC CSKA Sofia matches